Russell Edwards Sprong (July 4, 1894 – February 9, 1956) was an American  football and basketball coach. He was the fifth head football coach at Northwest Missouri State Teacher's College—now known as Northwest Missouri State University—in Maryville, Missouri, serving for one season, in 1921, and compiling a record of 2–6.  Sprong was also the head basketball coach at Northwest Missouri State for the 1921–22 season, tallying a mark of 0–15.

Sprong graduated from Des Moines High School in Des Moines, Iowa before he attended Drake University, where he played college football.  He was the line coach at Drake in 1920.  After his stint at Northwest Missouri State, he was the freshman coach at the University of Kansas, where he also earned a master's degree.  Following two years of coaching at Rubidoux Polytechnic High School in St. Joseph, Missouri, Sprong was hired in September 1925 as head football coach and physical education instructor at Long Beach High School in Long Beach, California.

Head coaching record

College football

References

External links
 

1894 births
1956 deaths
American football centers
Basketball coaches from Kansas
Drake Bulldogs football coaches
Drake Bulldogs football players
Northwest Missouri State Bearcats athletic directors
Northwest Missouri State Bearcats football coaches
Northwest Missouri State Bearcats men's basketball coaches
High school football coaches in Missouri
People from Leavenworth County, Kansas
Sportspeople from Des Moines, Iowa
Players of American football from Des Moines, Iowa